The Jablanica Dam is an arch-gravity dam on the Neretva River about  northwest of Jablanica in the Herzegovina-Neretva Canton of Bosnia and Herzegovina. The dam was constructed between 1947 and 1955 with the primary purpose of hydroelectric power production. The power station was commissioned in two stages, from 1955 until 1958. The first generator was commissioned in February 1955. An upgrade in 2008 increased the installed capacity of the power station from 150 MW to 180 MW. It contains six 30 MW Francis turbine-generators for an installed capacity of 180 MW. The dam and power station are owned and operated by Elektroprivreda Bosne i Hercegovine.

References

External links
Priča o stanovnicima desne obale Jablaničkog jezera, documentary film about inhabitants of the right bank of the Neretva's artificial lake Jablaničko, left behind without any land connection to the main transportation route after reservoir is created with construction of Jablanica Hydroelectric Power Station (YouTube)
 Priča o jezeru, documentary film about creation of the Neretva's artificial lake Jablaničko, reservoir created with construction of Jablanica Hydroelectric Power Station - screenplay & director: Gojko Šipovac (YouTube)
 Hidroelektrana Jablanica, documentary film on construction of the Jablanica Hydroelectric Power Station - screenplay: engineers Hercegovac, Radulović, and Jović; director: Slobodan Radulović (YouTube)

Arch-gravity dams
Jablanica, Bosnia and Herzegovina
Dams in Bosnia and Herzegovina
Dams completed in 1955
Energy infrastructure completed in 1958
Hydroelectric power stations in Bosnia and Herzegovina
1955 establishments in Bosnia and Herzegovina
Underground hydroelectric power stations in Bosnia and Herzegovina